NS Brukkaros (C13) is a patrol boat of the Namibian Navy. It was commissioned on 27 October 2017. Previously a Haiqing-class submarine chaser of the People's Liberation Army Navy, it was donated by the Chinese government in 2014.

Description
The Haiqing class are a follow-on class of submarine chasers to the preceding Type 037 submarine chasers of the People's Liberation Army Navy. The ship is armed with two 6-tubed anti-submarine mortar launchers. It is also armed with two 37 mm guns. It served in the PLA Navy as the Ledong(hull 748) before being decommissioned on the 3 June 2016 at a Naval port in Chinas Hainan province.

Operational history
The boat was previously a PLA Navy ship. In 2014 the Chinese government offered to donate it to the Namibian Navy. The patrol boat was then refurbished by Poly Technologies after which Namibian crews went to China for training on the ship. The ship was then shipped to Namibia on the deck of the cargo ship Da Qing and arrived in Namibia on 9 July 2017. Brukkaros, named after the Brukkaros Mountain in ǁKaras Region, was commissioned on 27 October 2017 by President Hage Geingob. The ship is operationally utilised for general exclusive economic zone management.

References

Ships of the Namibian Navy